The 1938 North Carolina Tar Heels football team represented the University of North Carolina at Chapel Hill during the 1938 college football season. The Tar Heels were led by third-year head coach Raymond Wolf and played their home games at Kenan Memorial Stadium. They competed as a member of the Southern Conference.

Team co-captain and tackle Steve Maronic was selected as a first-team All-American by the Central Press Association, and a second-team All-American by Newsweek, NEA, and United Press.

Schedule

References

North Carolina
North Carolina Tar Heels football seasons
North Carolina Tar Heels football